Isoelectronicity is a phenomenon observed when two or more molecules have the same structure (positions and connectivities among atoms) and the same electronic configurations, but differ by what specific elements are at certain locations in the structure.

This definition is sometimes termed valence isoelectronicity.  Definitions can sometimes be not as strict, sometimes requiring identity of the total electron count and with it the entire electronic configuration.  More usually, definitions are broader, and may extend to allowing different numbers of atoms in the species being compared.

The importance of the concept lies in identifying significantly related species, as pairs or series.  Isoelectronic species can be expected to show useful consistency and predictability in their properties, so identifying a compound as isoelectronic with one already characterised offers clues to possible properties and reactions  (Differences in properties such as electronegativity of the atoms in isolelectronic species can affect reactivity.)

These ions would be described as being isoelectronic with hydrogen.

Examples

The  atom and the  ion are isoelectronic because each has five valence electrons, or more accurately an electronic configuration of [He] 2s2 2p3.

Molecular orbital diagrams best illustrate isoelectronicity in diatomic molecules, showing how atomic orbital mixing in isoelectronic species results in identical orbital combination, and thus also bonding.

More complex molecules can be polyatomic also. For example, the amino acids serine, cysteine, and selenocysteine are all isoelectronic to each other. They differ by which specific chalcogen is present at one location in the side-chain.

They do have the same number of electrons but they do not have the same structure.

See also
 Isolobal principle

References

Theoretical chemistry